PHP Family (previously known as PHP Group of Industries) is a Bangladeshi conglomerate based in Chittagong. It was envisioned in 1969 by Sufi Mohammed Mizanur Rahman who is the chairman of the group as of 2018. PHP Group is active in business like steel, float glass, aluminum, textiles, power, petro, refinery, financial service, agro and so on.

Businesses 

 PHP Cold Rolling Mills Ltd.
 PHP Steels Ltd.
 PHP Ispat Ltd.
 PHP Continuous Galvanizing Mills Ltd.
 PHP NOF Continuous Galvanizing Mills Ltd.
 PHP Ship Breaking & Re-Cycling Industries Ltd.
 PHP Power Generation Plant Ltd.
 PHP Power Company Ltd.
 PHP Float Glass Industries Ltd.
 PHP Agro Products Ltd.
 PHP Corporation Ltd.
 PHP Overseas Ltd.
 BAY Terminal and Distribution Company Ltd.
 PHP Petro Refinery Ltd.
 PHP Stocks & Securities Ltd.
 PHP Cotton Mills Ltd.
 PHP Spinning Mills Ltd.
 PHP Rotor Spinning Mills Ltd.
 Pelican Properties Ltd.
 Dina Cold Storage Ltd.
 PHP Latex and Rubber Products Ltd.
 PHP Fisheries Ltd.
University of Information Technology & Sciences (UITS)
 Alhaj Sufi Mohammed Dayemuddin Hospital

PHP Automobiles Limited 
PHP Automobiles Limited is a part of PHP Family that started production of Proton cars since 2017 branded as Proton PHP.

Apart from automobiles, the company also produces motorbikes. PHP Automobiles Limited - Bangladesh's only privately car maker.

In the year of 2015, The Honorable Prime Minister and The Prominent Malaysian leader Mahathir Bin Mohamad was invited special guest to a program at University of Information Technology and Science. After recognizing the immense opportunity and capability of PHP Family he (Mahathir Bin Mohamad) approached the honorable Chairman of PHP Family to start automotive business. It would be similar to what Mahathir Bin Mohamad did in 1983 with Proton cars and to make a revolution in Bangladesh automotive sector and further he invited PHP Family to visit the factory of Proton cars in Malaysia. Following the invitation PHP Family authorities visited the factory of Proton Cars in Malaysia. After that PHP Family took quick initiative to construct a factory of car manufacturing on a land of 4.5 lakhs square-feet area in Chittagong and started full operation from March 2015. From 2019, the factory had been continuing at full volume. Now, it is capable of assembling 1,200 units of cars in a year. PHP Automobiles is now a two phases away from becoming a hundred percent car manufacturer.

PHP Automobiles captured 20% of the Sedan's market share in Chittagong city in Bangladesh. Company's Managing Director's motto to promote "Made in Bangladesh" car has been being the core inspiration for the engineers and employees of PHP Automobiles.

Controversies 
On 4 March 2022, Department of Environment  filed a case against PHP Float Glass Industries Limited for blocking a waterfall by building dams and razing hills at Barabkunda of Sitakunda upazila in Chattogram in order to water their mango orchard. The lawsuit accused the managing director of PHP Family, manager of the company's mango orchard project, and head of human resources of the company. A summon was issued against them instructing to remove the dam within 7 days. However it was found that the dam was not removed even after 14 days after it was issued.

References

Manufacturing companies established in 1969
Companies based in Chittagong
Steel companies of Bangladesh
Bangladeshi brands
Glassmaking companies of Bangladesh
Conglomerate companies of Bangladesh